Psycroptic is the eponymous sixth studio album by Australian technical death metal band Psycroptic. It was released digitally on 10 March 2015 and physically released on 13 Mar 2015 by EVP Recordings in Australia and Prosthetic Records in North America. A Deluxe Edition CD and DVD limited to 500 copies was released in Australia.

Track listing

Personnel
Psycroptic
 Cameron Grant - bass
 David Haley - drums
 Joe Haley -guitars
 Jason Peppiatt - vocals

Production and artwork
 Joe Haley - production, engineering, mixing
 Metastazis - cover artwork
 Alan Douches - mastering

References

External links
 iTunes - Music - Psycroptic by Psycroptic

2015 albums
Psycroptic albums
Century Media Records albums